Jiang Zhujiu (born February 17, 1962, in Taiyuan) is a Chinese professional Go player.

Biography 
Jiang began playing Go when he was 6. In 1982, he was 5 dan, and 1987 he was promoted to 7 dan. Earlier in his career, he competed in some of the top Chinese tournaments. In the National Go Individual, he achieved 4th place on two occasions; in 1983 and 1987. In 1988, he was fifth, and in 1989 he was runner up. In 1986, he became runner up for the New Sports Cup. His biggest feat came in 1989, when he just narrowly lost to Liu Xiaoguang in the final of the Tianyuan, three games to two. In 2003, he won the Maxim Cup, having to beat his wife, Rui Naiwei. He and Rui currently reside in South Korea, and have been competing for the Hanguk Kiwon since 1999. His elder brother Jiang Mingjiu is also a professional Go player.

Past titles & Runner up's

References

External links 
 Korea Baduk Association profile (in Korean)

Living people
1962 births
Chinese Go players
Sportspeople from Taiyuan